Lodz Airport Central Poland , formerly known as Łódź-Lublinek Airport, is a regional airport in central Poland, located approximately  southwest of Łódź city center. Łódź ranked 8th among Polish airports in 2013 in passenger numbers. The airport has been in operation since 13 September 1925 and has recently undergone a number of upgrades, enabling it to handle services by low cost airlines to destinations in Europe.

History

Early years
Łódź Airport opened on 13 September 1925. During World War II, the German occupying forces improved the airport for military use, by building a concrete  runway. In the immediate postwar years, the airport was a key transport hub, but that role diminished by the 1950s with the development of Warsaw airport. By the end of the decade, regular passenger connections to Łódź were suspended. Efforts to restart passenger traffic were undertaken in the 1990s.

In 1997, a new passenger terminal (capacity approx. 50,000/year) was opened. Since 1997, Port Lotniczy Łódź-Lublinek sp. z o.o. (Lodz-Lublinek Airport LLC) has been the operator of the airport, changing its name in 2007 to Port Lotniczy Łódź im. Władysława Reymonta Sp. z o.o. (LODZ WLADYSLAW REYMONT AIRPORT LLC).

Development since the 2000s
On 31 October 2002, an ILS/DME System (instrument landing system/distance measuring equipment) was installed at the airport.

On 28 October 2005, a new passenger terminal, Terminal 2 (capacity approx. about 300,000/year) was opened. Two days later, the first Boeing 737 in the history of the Łódź Airport landed.

In June 2012, the brand new Terminal 3 with a capacity for 1.5–2 million passengers per year was opened. The capacity is more than 5 times that of the old terminal. Terminal 2 was dismantled and sold to Radom for their new airport. 
The airport has been renamed after the celebrated 20th century Polish writer and the winner of the 1924 Nobel Prize in Literature, Władysław Reymont.

After the A2 motorway between Łódź and Warsaw opened in 2012, which reduced the travel time between the two cities to about one hour, the Łódź airport has faced tougher competition from the two Warsaw airports (Warsaw Chopin and  Warsaw-Modlin). As a consequence, the number of passengers using it has fallen. The airport no longer has any domestic destinations since the bankruptcy of OLT Express in July 2012, which had also planned a number of international services. Due to low passengers numbers, Łódź Airport has been cited as an example of inefficient use of EU subsidies.

In October 2019, Lufthansa terminated their short-lived route to Munich Airport.

Airlines and destinations
The following airlines operate regular scheduled and charter flights at Łódź Władysław Reymont Airport:

Statistics

See also
 List of airports in Poland
 Air ambulances in Poland

References

Bibliography

External links

Official website of Łódź Airport 
Official website of Łódź Airport 
Lotnisko dla Łodzi Association (The Airport for Łódź Association) 

Airport
Airports in Poland
1925 establishments in Poland
Buildings and structures in Łódź
Airports established in 1925